The 2022 Michigan State Spartans football team was an American football team that represented Michigan State University in the East Division of the Big Ten Conference during the 2022 NCAA Division I FBS football season. The Spartans were led by third-year head coachMel Tucker. The Spartans played their home games at Spartan Stadium in East Lansing, Michigan. 

The Spartans opened the season ranked No. 15 in the AP poll. After winning the first two games of the season, the Spartans lost four consecutive games against Washington, Minnesota, Maryland, and Ohio State. They rebounded with a double-overtime victory over Wisconsin. However, the Spartans lost three of their final five games, including to rival Michigan, to end the season. They finished the season 5–7, 3–6 in Big Ten play to finish in fifth place in the East division. They failed to qualify for a bowl game for the second time in three years.

Previous season
The Spartans finished the 2021 season 11–2, 7–2 in Big Ten play to finish in third place in the East division, and ranked No. 10 in the College Football Playoff. MSU was selected to participate in the Peach Bowl on December 30, the school's first New Year's Six bowl game since 2015. The Spartans defeated Pittsburgh 31–21 in the Peach Bowl.

Running back Kenneth Walker III was a consensus All-American and became the first Spartan to win the Walter Camp and Doak Walker awards. Walker led the Spartans and was second in the country with 1,636 rushing yards. MSU had the nation's worst passing defense, allowing 337.7 yards per game.

On November 24, 2021, the school announced that they had signed Tucker to a 10-year, $95 million contract extension, all through donor money, amid speculations of Tucker being sought after for other college and NFL coaching positions.

Offseason

2022 NFL draft
Consensus All-American running back Kenneth Walker III, offensive lineman Kevin Jarvis, and wide receiver Jalen Nailor declared for the NFL draft. After breaking its 80-year streak of having players taken in the NFL draft the previous year, four MSU players were drafted in the 2022 NFL draft.

Several other undrafted players signed free agent contracts with NFL teams:

 Jacub Panasiuk, defensive end, Washington Commanders
 Kevin Jarvis, offensive lineman, Detroit Lions

Coaching changes
On December 4, 2021, cornerbacks coach Travares Tillman took the defensive backs coaching position at his alma mater, Georgia Tech. On December 24, running backs coach William Peagler left MSU to become the tight ends coach at Florida. On January 13, 2022, the school named Effrem Reed. who had previously served as an offensive analyst with the Spartans, the new running backs coach. On January 15, the school officially named Brandon Jordan as a pass rush specialist coach. On January 16, it was announced that defensive line coach Ron Burton was leaving the school after eight years with the Spartans. On February 8, the school named Georgia Tech assistant Marco Coleman the new defensive line coach.

Returning players
Leading receiver Jayden Reed announced he would return for another season at MSU.  MSU captain and leading tackler, safety Xavier Henderson, also announced he would return for the 2022 season.

Transfers

Outgoing

Source

Incoming

Source

Recruiting

Personnel

Players

Coaching staff

Schedule
On January 12, the Big Ten released the full, revised schedules for the conference.

Rankings

Game summaries

Western Michigan

In the first game of the season, the Spartans, ranked No. 15 (AP)  in the country, faced Western Michigan at Spartan Stadium. The game marked the first time that MSU starting quarterback Payton Thorne would face his father, Jeff Thorne, the new offensive coordinator for the Broncos.

Michigan State got the ball first, but went three-and-out and WMU also followed with a punt. The Spartans were forced to punt again on the ensuing possession. The Broncos moved into MSU territory on their next possession before stalling at the Spartans 10 yard line and settling for a field goal to give WMU the early 3–0 lead. MSU answered quickly, moving into Bronco territory  in four plays before freshman wide receiver Germie Bernard caught a 44-yard touchdown pass from Payton Thorne to give the Spartans the 7–3 lead. The MSU defensed forced a three-and-out on the next possession and the Spartans again moved into WMU territory. Early in the second quarter, Thorne threw his second touchdown pass of the game, a one-handed grab by Illinois tight end transfer Daniel Barker to move the MSU lead to 14–3. Following another punt by Western Michigan, the Spartans scored on a two-play drive that ended with Thorne's third touchdown pass of the season, this one to Keon Coleman. Trailing 21–3, The Broncos moved deep into MSU territory, but a sack and forced fumble by Jacoby Windmon was recovered by MSU cornerback Charles Kimbrough to end the WMU drive. Following a punt by the Spartans, the Broncos again moved into MSU territory, but a fumble by WMU running back Sean Tyler was recovered by Simeon Barrow to again end the drive. After moving to the 26 yard line, Thorne was intercepted and WMU took over with 44 seconds left in the half. Western Michigan chose to run out the clock and the game went to halftime with MSU up 21–3.

Following a WMU punt to start the third quarter, the Spartans moved to midfield before running Jalen Berger fumbled the ball and the Broncos recovered to end the drive. A 45-yard run by WMU's Tyler set the Broncos up at the MSU four and Tyler capped the drive with a rushing touchdown to narrow MSU's lead to 21–10. The Spartans responded by moving to the WMU 27, but the drive stalled and the Spartans were forced to attempt a field goal. The 44-yard attempt was no good and the Broncos took over at the 27. They again moved into Spartan territory, but were forced to settle for a 42-yard field goal to narrow the lead to eight points. As the fourth quarter began, MSU was forced to punt again. Following a WMU punt, the Spartans turned to the run game, led by Berger. Four straight rushes by Berger left MSU at WMU's one yard line and a fifth rush by Berger on fourth down put MSU in the end zone for the first in the second half. Trailing 28–12, WMU went for it on fourth down with under five minutes remaining, but were unsuccessful, setting the Spartans up at the Bronco 43. On the first play of the drive, Thorne threw his fourth touchdown on the day, this to Tre Mosley, to push MSU's lead to 35–13 with just over four minutes left in the game. The Broncos could not get out of their own end on the ensuing drive and were forced to punt which allowed MSU to runout the clock. The 35–13 win moved MSU to 1–0 on the season.

Payton Thorne threw four touchdowns in the win, but only completed 50% of his passes. Jalen Berger rushed for 120 of MSU's 197 yards on the ground in the win. MSU defensive end Jacoby Windmon had four sacks in the game and was named the Big Ten Conference Defensive Player of the Week. He was named the Walter Camp National Defensive Played of the Week. He was also named national defensive player of the week by Reese's Senior Bowl.

Akron

In game two of the season, the Spartans, now ranked No. 14 (AP), welcomed Akron to Spartan Stadium, marking the teams' first game against each other since 1914. The Spartans were without top defenders linebacker Darius Snow, who was injured in the prior game and will miss the rest of the season, and safety Xavier Henderson.

The Spartans won the toss and deferred to the second half, so Akron received the ball first. The Zips were able to move into MSU territory fairly easily as mobile quarterback DJ Irons moved through the Spartan defense. However, Irons's pass to TJ Banks was fumbled by Banks at the MSU 20 and Cal Haladay picked up the ball and returned it 21 yards to the MSU 41. Jalen Berger gouged the Zips defense and Payton Thorne hit Jayden Reed to put the ball at the Akron seven. Jarek Broussard took over at running back and moved the ball to the on and then into the end zone to give MSU the early 7–0 lead. The teams exchanged punts on their next possessions before the Zips turned it over again on forced fumble by Jacoby Windmon. Maverick Hansen recovered the ball at the Akron 45. Broussard took over the majority of the possession, but Berger came in with the ball at the and scored his first touchdown of the day as the Spartans went ahead 14–0. Following an Akron punt early in the second quarter, Thorne was intercepted after being hit while throwing the ball and the Spartans turned the ball over to the Zips at the Akron 45. The MSU defense was able to keep the Zips from scoring and forced a punt. On the ensuing possession, the Spartans moved to midfield, but came up short on a fourth down try turning the ball over on downs. With Akron quarterback Irons injured and out of the game, the Zips still took over in MSU territory. However, another fumble, the third on the day was recovered at the MSU 40 giving the ball back to the Spartans. The Spartans again moved the Akron one and Berger scored his second touchdown of the game to move the lead to 21–0. Following a punt by the Zips, the Spartans took over with 57 second left in the half. As time ran out, Jack Stone kicked his first field goal from 43 yards to give MSU the 24–0 halftime lead.

With the Spartans starting the half with the ball, Thorne was intercepted on the first play from scrimmage on a deep pass that resulted with Akron taking over at their own 30. Two plays later, Haladay sacked Zips' backup quarterback Jeff Undercuffer and forced a fumble that was recovered by MSU at the Akron 20. It was the fourth turnover of the game, all fumbles, by Akron. Thorne, who was shaken up when hit while throwing the interception on the previous drive, was replaced by Noah Kim. On the second play of the drive, Kim threw a 16-yard touchdown pass to Tre Mosely to give  MSU a 31–0 lead. Following a punt by Akron, Thorne returned to the game and MSU turned to the running game as Berger and Broussard moved MSU to the Akron two before Broussard scored his second touchdown of the game further extending the Spartan lead. Following another Akron punt, the MSU run game again moved the ball into Zips' territory and Berger scored his third touchdown of the game and giving MSU a 45–0. An Elijah Collins rushing touchdown on the next drive for the Spartans finished the scoring. With backups in for the fourth quarter, no team could score as MSU won 52–0. The win moved MSU to 2–0 on the season.

Payton Thorne struggled in the game, throwing two interceptions, but did complete 64% of his passes. Jalen Berger again rushed for over 100 yards while Jarek Broussard added 81 yards as the Spartans scored from the ground on six of their seven touchdowns. For the second consecutive week, Jacoby Windmon was named Big Ten Defensive Player of the Week after notching 1.5 sacks and three forced fumbles.

Washington

The newly ranked No. 11 (AP) Spartans traveled to face Washington for the team's first road game of the season. Washington's quarterback Michael Penix Jr., a former player for Indiana, had faced the Spartans twice previously.

Washington immediately took control of the game driving quickly into Spartan territory and scored an eight yard touchdown pass by Penix to give the Huskies the early 7–0 lead. MSU managed one first down on the next possession before punting. The Huskies again moved quickly into MSU territory, but were stuffed on fourth down from the one giving MSU the ball back at their own two. However, on the first play from scrimmage, Jarek Broussard slipped coming out of the backfield and did not make it out of the end zone resulting in a safety and a 9–0 Washington lead. The ensuing free kick went out of bounds and the Huskies quickly scored again to move the lead 16–0 early in the second quarter. Following another punt by the Spartans, the Huskies continued to gash the Spartan secondary and Penix threw his second touchdown pass of the game to balloon the lead to 22–0. The Spartans embarked on a 15-play, 75-yard drive including two fourth down conversions and capped off by Payton Thorne's touchdown pass to Keon Coleman. The two-point conversion, also from Thorne to Coleman drew the Spartans within 14. Needing a stop to keep the game in question with 1:22 left in the half, the Spartans defense continued its poor play and Penix quickly threw his third touchdown of the game as the lead moved to 29–8 at the half

Getting the ball first in the third quarter, Thorne hit Tre Mosley for a 26-yard touchdown pass. With a failed two-point conversion, the lead was reduced to 29–14. The MSU defense was exploited again by Penix on the ensuing possession and he threw his fourth touchdown pass of the game as the lead moved to 36–14 with just under 11 minutes left in the third quarter. MSU was forced to punt following a sack of Thorne on a third-and-20 play and the Huskies took over with 4:27 left in the quarter. For the first time in the game, the Spartans forced a Washington punt albeit with the Huskies choosing to take time off the clock more than in their previous possessions. As the game moved to the fourth quarter, the Spartans chose to go for it on fourth down from their own 24 and failed. The Huskies moved to the MSU one, but turned the ball over on downs. Payton Thorne was intercepted on the next play and the Huskies added a field goal to pus the lead to 25. An Elijah Collins rushing touchdown narrowed the lead to 39–20 when the two-point conversion failed. A failed onside kick resulted in a Huskies' punt. Thorne threw his third touchdown pass of the game, his second to Keon Coleman, but the two-point conversion failed. With 5:17 remaining in the game and trailing 39–28, the Spartans again attempted an onside kick, but the Huskies recovered. Following a Washington punt, the Spartans were able to move to midfield, but turned the ball over on downs with less than three minutes left in the game. The Huskies were successfully able to run out the clock to win the game 39–28.

The Spartan pass defense, the worst in FBS the prior season, allowed 397 yards in the game as they were gashed time and again by Michael Penix Jr. Payton Thorne played well in the defeat, throwing for 323 yards and three touchdowns. The Spartan rush game was a disaster, only gaining 42 yards in the game. The loss dropped the Spartans to 2–1 on the season.

Minnesota

Following the humbling loss to the Huskies, the Spartans dropped out of the AP poll while remaining ranked at No. 21 in the coaches poll. They returned home to face Minnesota in the first conference game of the season.

Once again, the Spartan defense was decimated by the opponent as the Gophers scored on their first possession, easily moving down the field to take a 7–0 lead. Following a three-and-out for MSU, the Gophers embarked on a nine-play drive as they again moved downfield easily and pushed the lead to 14–0. Following another three-and-out for the Spartan offense, the Gophers into MSU territory, but the drive stalled at the eight. A field goal by Minnesota moved the lead to 17–0 early in the second quarter. The Spartans got two first downs on their next drive, but Payton Thorne was intercepted on fourth down setting Minnesota up at their own 33. After moving to the Spartan 24, a fumble gave the Spartans the ball again with 4:41 left in the half. MSU was only able to move to midfield before being forced to punt again. Minnesota moved to midfield on the ensuing possession, but the clock ran out as they went to halftime with a 17-point lead. 

Looking to get back into the game to start the third quarter, the Spartans moved into Gopher territory before Thorne fumbled the ball at the Minnesota six, ending the drive. Minnesota answered with a 12-play, 90 yard drive to move the lead to 24–0. On the next possession for the Spartans, Thorne was intercepted again setting Minnesota up at the MSU 28. As the game moved to the fourth quarter, the Gophers scored their fourth touchdown of the game moving their lead to 31 points with 14:08 left in the game. Following yet another punt by MSU, the Gophers wen on a 15 play, 76-yard drive that took over 10 minutes before settling for a field goal to push the lead to 34–0 with 1:48 left in the game. MSU went to backups and the Spartans moved quickly downfield before Noah Kim hit Germie Bernard for a 27-yard touchdown to notch the first Spartan points of the game with 17 seconds left in the game. The Gophers ran out the clock to earn the 34–7 win.

MSU's defense was thrashed once again, allowing 268 yards through the air and 240 yards rushing. MSU's offense struggled mightily only gaining 240 yards compared to Minnesota's 508 yards. Minnesota dominated the game, running 74 plays to MSU's 45. The loss dropped the Spartans to 2–2 on the season and 0–1 in Big Ten play.

Maryland

No. 3 Ohio State

Wisconsin

No. 4 Michigan

No. 16 Illinois

Rutgers

Indiana

No. 11 Penn State

References

Michigan State
Michigan State Spartans football seasons
Michigan State Spartans football